The Italian-American Civil Rights League (IACRL) was originally formed as a political advocacy group created in New York City in April 1970. William Santoro, a defense attorney that represented many Colombo crime family figures, was responsible for the legal work that incorporated the league. Its stated goal was to combat pejorative stereotypes about Italian-Americans, but in actuality, it operated as a public relations firm to deny the existence of the American Mafia and improve the image of mobsters.

History
In April 1970, Joseph Colombo created the Italian-American Civil Rights League, the month his son Joseph Colombo Jr. was charged with melting down coins for resale as silver ingots. In response, Joseph Colombo Sr. claimed FBI harassment of Italian Americans and, on April 30, 1970, sent 30 picketers outside FBI headquarters at Third Avenue and 69th Street to protest the federal persecution of all Italians everywhere; this went on for weeks. On June 29, 1970, 50,000 people attended the first Italian Unity Day rally in Columbus Circle in New York City. Footage of the 1970 rally appeared in the film Days of Fury (1979), directed by Fred Warshofsky and hosted by Vincent Price. In February 1971, Colombo Jr. was acquitted of the charge after the chief witness in the trial had been arrested on perjury charges.

The group then turned its attention to what it perceived as cultural slights against Italian-Americans, using boycott threats to force Alka-Seltzer and the Ford Motor Company to withdraw television commercials the league objected to. Another group success was that U.S. Attorney General John Mitchell ordered the U.S. Justice Department to stop using the word "Mafia" in official documents and press releases. The league also secured an agreement from Albert S. Ruddy, the producer of The Godfather, to omit the terms "Mafia" and "cosa nostra" from the film's dialogue, and succeeded in having Macy's stop selling a board game called The Godfather Game.  The League strong-armed merchants and residents in Little Italy to purchase and display league decals opposing the film. The League threatened to shut down the Teamsters, which included the truckers, drivers, and crew members who were essential to making the film. The IACRL boycotted the Ford Motor Company because of its sponsorship of the television show The F.B.I. and its negative references to Italian-Americans as gangsters.

On June 28, 1971, at the second Italian Unity Day rally in Columbus Circle in Manhattan, Colombo was shot three times, once in the head, by Jerome A. Johnson; Johnson was immediately killed by Colombo's bodyguards. Colombo survived the shooting, but was paralyzed; Colombo died seven years later from cardiac arrest due to injuries sustained from the shooting.

By the 2000s, the Italian-American Civil Rights League came to offer various youth and other programs.

References

External links
IACRL Official Website
Crime Library: Colombo Family, chronicle of 1971 rally in Columbus Circle by the Italian-American Civil Rights League

Further reading
 Capria, Don and Anthony Colombo. Colombo: The Unsolved Murder. New York: Unity Press, 2015, 

Organizations established in 1970
1970 establishments in New York City
Italian-American organized crime
Italian-American organizations
Italian-American culture in New York City
Civic and political organizations of the United States
Civil rights organizations in the United States
Political advocacy groups in the United States
Defunct American political movements
Colombo crime family
The Godfather